The 2019 Worcester City Council election took place on 2 May 2019 to elect councillors to the Worcester City Council in England.

Results summary

Ward results

Arboretum

Bedwardine

Cathedral

Claines

Nunnery

St. Clement

St. John

St. Peter's Parish

St. Stephen

Warndon Parish North

Warndon Parish South

References

2019 English local elections
2019
2010s in Worcestershire